Strawberry Hill is an affluent area of the London Borough of Richmond upon Thames in Twickenham. It is a suburban development situated 10.4 miles (16.7 km) west south-west of Charing Cross. It consists of a number of residential roads centred on a small development of shops and served by Strawberry Hill railway station. The area's ACORN demographic type is characterised as well-off professionals, larger houses, and converted flats. St Mary's University, Twickenham, the country's oldest Roman Catholic University, is situated on Waldegrave Road. Its sports grounds were used as a training site for the 2012 Olympics.

Strawberry Hill House & Garden

The eighteenth-century development is named after "Strawberry Hill", the fanciful Gothic Revival villa designed by author Horace Walpole between 1749 and 1776. The original owner had named the house "Chopped Straw Hall", but Walpole wanted it to be called something more distinctive and after finding an old lease that described his land as "Strawberry Hill Shot", he adopted this name.

After a £9 million, two year restoration, Strawberry Hill House re-opened to the public in October 2010. It housed famous eighteenth-century literary figures such as Alexander Pope and Horace Walpole.

Other attractions 

Other local attractions include:
 St Mary's University, Twickenham
 Radnor Gardens
 Strawberry Hill railway station, built in 1873, is an example of the Victorian era railway building boom.
 Strawberry Hill Golf Course, opened in 1900 and designed by 5-time Open champion, JH Taylor

Education

References

Notes
Jones, E. and Woodward, C. A Guide to the Architecture of London, 1983, Weidenfeld & Nicolson, London

External links

 The Strawberry Hill Residents' Association

Areas of London
Districts of the London Borough of Richmond upon Thames
Twickenham